Sweet Alyssum is a 1915 American silent drama film directed by Colin Campbell and starring Tyrone Power Sr., Kathlyn Williams, and Edith Johnson.<ref>Guide to the Silent Years of American Cinema, p. 66</ref>

Cast
 Tyrone Power Sr. as Roanoke Brooks 
 Kathlyn Williams as Daisy Brooks 
 Edith Johnson as Sweet Alyssum 
 Wheeler Oakman as Wynne Garlan 
 Frank Clark as Robert Garlan 
 Harry Lonsdale as Thurlow

References

Bibliography
 Donald W. McCaffrey & Christopher P. Jacobs. Guide to the Silent Years of American Cinema. Greenwood Publishing, 1999.

External links
 

1915 films
1915 drama films
1910s English-language films
American silent feature films
Silent American drama films
American black-and-white films
Films directed by Colin Campbell
1910s American films